The Cry of the Excluded is a number of popular demonstrations in Brazil held every year during the week of September 7, the Brazilian Independence Day, to ask for attention for the people that are excluded of all what makes life worth as a human being.

Started in 1995 as an initiative of the Roman Catholic bishops, since then it has settled down in more than 20 countries in the Americas and the Caribbean.

In Brazil, the events started has a different theme every year, with marches, demonstrations, seminars, classes, and talks take place in capital cities all over the country throughout the week.

References

External links

Protests in Brazil
Left-wing politics in Brazil
Social movements
Social movements in Brazil
Social justice organizations